16 Persei is a single, suspected variable star in the northern constellation of Perseus, located approximately 121 light years away based on parallax. It is visible to the naked eye as a yellow-white hued star with an apparent visual magnitude of 4.22. This object is moving further from the Earth with a heliocentric radial velocity of +14 km/s.

Based upon a stellar classification of F2 III, this matches an aging giant star that has exhausted the hydrogen at its core and is evolving away from the main sequence. It is a possible pulsating Delta Scuti variable, although there is some uncertainty about this classification. However, Kunzli and North (1998) found no variation. The star is 1.44 billion years old with 1.8 times the mass of the Sun and 3.2 times the Sun's radius. It shows a high rotation rate with a projected rotational velocity of 149 km/s, which is causing an equatorial bulge that is an estimated 24% larger than the polar radius. 16 Persei is radiating 23 times the Sun's luminosity from its photosphere at an effective temperature of 7,004 K.

It has two reported visual companions: B, with magnitude 12.8 and separation 76.7", and C, with magnitude 10.43 and separation 234".

References

F-type giants
Delta Scuti variables
Perseus (constellation)
BD+37 646
Persei, 16
017584
013254
0840